Pietro Carloni (28 October 1896 – 3 August 1968) was an Italian stage and film actor.

Life and career 
Born in Taurisano, Lecce into a family of actors, Carloni debuted on stage at young age in the theatrical company held by Ernesto Murolo. In 1921 he met on stage Titina De Filippo, whom he married one year later and with whom he started a long professional association, appearing in almost all her stage works. Carloni was also active in films and in television miniseries, mainly cast in character roles. His siblings Ester, Maria, Adelina and Ettore were fellow actors. His sister Adelina (or Adele) Carloni married his wife Titina's brother Peppino De Filippo. Well-known actor Eduardo De Filippo was another of his wife's siblings.

Partial filmography 

 Assunta Spina (1948) - Il presidente del tribunale (uncredited)
 Side Street Story (1950) - Un soldato americano
 Filumena Marturano (1951)
 Cops and Robbers (1951) - The Police Commissioner
 La macchina ammazzacattivi (1952)
 Deceit (1952) - Un commissario di polizia
 Five Paupers in an Automobile (1952) - Fabio Mazzetti
 Toto and the King of Rome (1952) - Capoufficio Capasso
 Non è vero... ma ci credo (1952) - Avvocato Donati
 I morti non pagano tasse (1952)
 Cats and Dogs (1952) - Cav. Anselmi
 Piovuto dal cielo (1953) - Ricco signore
 Martin Toccaferro (1953)
 It Happened at the Police Station (1954) - Deputy Police Commissioner
 Too Bad She's Bad (1954) - Il signore intriguante
 A Hero of Our Times (1955) - (uncredited)
 The Two Friends (1955) - Commissario
 Roman Tales (1955) - The Restaurant Manager (uncredited)
 Da qui all'eredità (1955)
 Susanna tutta panna (1957)
 Carmela è una bambola (1958) - The Judge
 Sogno di una notte di mezza sbornia (1959) - Il dottore
 Lo smemorato di Collegno (1962) - Francesco Ballarini
 The Four Monks (1962) - Il fruttivendolo
 Toto vs. the Four (1963) - Cognato di Lancetti
 Toto and Cleopatra (1963) - Lepido
 Toto vs. the Black Pirate (1964) - Il governatore
 Bianco, rosso, giallo, rosa (1964)
 Made in Italy (1965) - The Judge (segment "2 'Il Lavoro', episode 2")
 More Than a Miracle (1967) - (final film role)

References

External links 
 
 
 

1896 births
1968 deaths
20th-century Italian male actors
Italian male film actors
Italian male television actors
Italian male stage actors
People from the Province of Lecce